Claire Beynon (born 1960) is a South African artist based in Dunedin, New Zealand. She was born in Johannesburg. She works in charcoal and pastel on paper, and has worked in mixed media, notably in the unusual material of slate.

In 2010 she was awarded the Antarctica Service Medal for her "valuable contributions to exploration and scientific achievement" in Antarctica.

References

1960 births
Living people
Artists from Dunedin